Simon Sears (born 25 January 1984) is a Danish actor.

Early life and education
Sears was born in Roskilde to an Italian father and Danish mother. He was raised in the town of Solrød Strand, and has two older siblings.

When he was younger, Sears was interested in dance, training at the Solrød Centre and performing at Bella Centeret and dance championships. As his father grew up financially unstable due to his grandfather being a painter, Sears explored a few careers options before settling on theatre. He briefly moved to Hjørring before going on to train at the Danish National School of Performing Arts in Copenhagen, graduating in 2014.

Career
In 2015, Sears had stage roles in Koks i kulissen, Cabaret, and Ødipus Laboratoriet at the Royal Danish Theatre and Visen om sidsel at Grønnegårds Teatret. He starred in his first feature-length film 9. April alongside Pilou Asbæk. The following year, he received the prestigious Reumert Talent Prize for his role in the 2016 production of Sidst på dagen er vi alle mennesker at the Betty Nansen Teatret with company Mammutteatret. He made his television debut with a recurring role in DR series Follow the Money.

Sears starred in 2017 film Winter Brothers (), earning him nominations at the Bodil Awards and Robert Awards. He began starring in the main role of Christian in DR series Ride Upon the Storm (), a role for which he is a two-time Robert Award for Best Actor in a Supporting Television Role nominee. He also won best actor at the Italian Digital Fiction Festival.

Sears starred in the 2020 Danish thriller Shorta. In October 2019, it was announced he would play Ivan in the Netflix series Shadow and Bone, an adaptation of overlapping fantasy book series Shadow and Bone and Six of Crows by Leigh Bardugo. The series premiered in 2021.

Personal life
Sears lives in Copenhagen with his Icelandic wife, Ingibjörg Skúladóttir, and their two sons. Their first son, Skúli Leví, was born the same day Sears won his Reumert Prize in 2016. Their second was born in 2019.

Filmography

Film

Television

Stage

Awards and nominations

References

External links

Living people
1984 births
21st-century Danish male actors
Danish people of Italian descent
People from Roskilde
People from Solrød Municipality